Stephen Turnham Pratt is a senior chemist and Argonne Distinguished Fellow (awarded 2019).  In September 2022, he was named the Interim Division Director for Chemical Sciences and Engineering (CSE) Division.  In addition to being the interim Division Director, he is the theme lead for CSE’s Fundamental Interactions Theme and the group leader for the Gas-Phase Chemical Dynamics group.

Research 
Pratt's research focuses on photoionization and photodissociation dynamics to understand how energy flows among the internal degrees of freedom in highly energized molecules. His experimental research program involves using laboratory-based lasers for multiphoton excitation and pump-probe experiments, and in using synchrotron sources for single-photon photoabsorption and photoionization studies of small molecules.

Education & Career 
Pratt received his BA in Chemistry from Bennington College, his MS, MPhil, and PhD in Chemistry from Yale University under the direction of William A. Chupka, and after graduation in 1982, he joined Argonne National Laboratory as a postdoctoral appointee working with Patricia A. Dehmer. He has published more than 150 journal articles, and in 1995, he was awarded the status of Fellow in the American Physical Society, after they were nominated by their Division of Atomic, Molecular & Optical Physics in 1995, for ''fundamental contributions to molecular physics through imaginative and innovative studies that probe electron-nuclear coupling, and, in particular, for his elegant experiments on molecular photoionization, predissociation, autoionization, and excited-state reactions.

Representative Publications

References 

Fellows of the American Physical Society
American physicists
21st-century American chemists
Argonne National Laboratory people
Bennington College alumni
Yale University alumni